Susanne Bickel (born 1960, in Rome) is a Swiss Egyptologist. She studied Egyptology in Geneva and then worked at the French Institute of Oriental Archaeology in Cairo and the Swiss Institute of Egyptian Antiquity. She has worked as an archaeologist on multiple sites in Middle and Upper Egypt.
Since 2000 she has been a lecturer at the University of Freiburg and since 2006, professor of Egyptology at the University of Basel where she is an expert on Ancient Egyptian deities and demons. Susanne Bickel's research focuses on religion and Egyptian archaeology, particularly the documentation of Egyptian temples. Bickel is director of the University of Basel Kings' Valley Project  and was a member of the team that excavated the KV64 tomb, containing the burial of Nehmes Bastet, in 2011.

Publications
 Katalytische und regulatorische Wechselwirkungen von Adeninnukleotiden mit der H+-ATPase des Chloroplasten, 1988
 Missions épigraphiques du Fonds de l'Egyptologie de Genève au Spéos Artémidos, 1988
 Telekommunikation und Gesellschaft : kritisches Jahrbuch der Telekommunikation. [1], 1991
 La cosmogonie égyptienne : avant le nouvel empire, 1994
 Tore und andere wiederverwendete Bauteile Amenophis' III, 1997
 Die Dekoration des Tempelhaustores unter Alexander IV : und der Südwand unter Augustus, 1998
 "Sortir au jour" : art égyptien de la Fondation Martin Bodmer, 2001
 Aspects et fonctions de la deification d'amenhotep III, 2002
 Werbung für die Götter: Heilsbringer aus 4000 Jahren, 2003
 Les animaux du 6ème jour : Les animaux dans la Bible et dans l'Orient ancien, 2003
 D'un monde á l'autre textes des pyramides & textes des sarcophages, 2004
 In ägyptischer Gesellschaft : Aegyptiaca der Sammlungen Bibel+Orient an der Universität Freiburg Schweiz, 2004
 Akhénaton et Néfertiti : soleil et ombres des pharaons, 2008
 Vergangenheit und Zukunft Studien zum historischen Bewusstsein in der Thutmosidenzeit, 2014
 La porte d'Horemheb au Xe pylône de Karnak, 2015
 Egypt and ancient Near East - perceptions of alterity, 2016
 Studies in Ancient Egyptian funerary literature, 2017

References

French Egyptologists
French archaeologists
French women archaeologists
Swiss archaeologists
Swiss women archaeologists
1960 births
Living people
Academic staff of the University of Freiburg
Academic staff of the University of Basel
French expatriates in Switzerland
Archaeologists from Rome
French women academics
French women historians
20th-century French non-fiction writers
21st-century French non-fiction writers
20th-century French women writers
21st-century French women writers
Members of the Institut Français d'Archéologie Orientale